The Samuel J. Heyman Service to America Medals, also known as "the Sammies", honor members of the federal government workforce, highlighting the work of employees making significant contributions to the governance of the United States. The awards are considered "the Oscars" of American government service. The Sammies accordingly celebrate excellence in the federal merit service.

Background
The awards have been presented annually since 2002 by the nonprofit, nonpartisan Partnership for Public Service to celebrate excellence in the U.S. federal civil service, and are named for Samuel J. Heyman, the organization's founder. To date, over 120 individuals and teams have been recognized.

Selection process
The Sammies are chosen from nominations collected each winter, and narrowed down to about 30 finalists announced mid-spring of each year during Public Service Recognition Week. The finalists are assessed, and from their ranks, eight awardees are selected by early fall. The Sammies selection committee is composed of nationally known journalists, political leaders, educators, and executives of large corporations. The eight awards cover the various sectors of federal public service. Honorees are chosen for their commitment and innovation, as well as the impact of their work on addressing the needs of the republic. Awardees are announced each fall at a dinner and awards ceremony in Washington, D.C. The Sammies finalists are those federal employees confronting complex issues of governance, including environmental, national security, and economic challenges. One criterion of the award is to qualify from among a dynamic group of talented, bright individuals working on behalf of the American people. The awards are organized and presented by the non-profit organization Partnership for Public Service.

Recipients

2000s

2010s

2020s

References

External links
 Service to America Medals
2020 Service to America Medals Awards Celebration

Civil service in the United States
Awards established in 2002
2002 establishments in the United States
Samuel J. Heyman